Marinos B.B.C., also referred to as Marinos de Anzoátegui, is a professional basketball club based in the port city of Puerto la Cruz, located in the Venezuelan Anzoátegui State. The team currently plays in Venezuela's Liga Profesional de Baloncesto. The team has won the Venezuelan championships 11 times.

Trophies
Liga Profesional de Baloncesto
Winners (11): 1991, 1993, 1998, 2003, 2004, 2005, 2009, 2011, 2012, 2014, 2015

Notable players

References

External links
Official Website
Official Facebook Page
Team profile – Eurobasket.com

Basketball teams established in 1976
Basketball teams in Venezuela
Sport in Puerto la Cruz